Szałamaje  is a settlement in the administrative district of Gmina Czersk, within Chojnice County, Pomeranian Voivodeship, in northern Poland.

For details of the history of the region, see History of Pomerania.

The settlement has a population of 61.

Transport 

Szałamaje boasts its own self-named railway station; a PSR (Polish State Railways - PKP in Polish) station. 
The station serves both passenger and freight trains. Its start station being Nowa Wieś Wielka and end station Gdynia Port Centralny.

References

Villages in Chojnice County